Eberhard W. Kornfeld (born 23 September 1923) is a Swiss auctioneer, author, art dealer and collector in Bern.

Early life 
Eberhard W. Kornfeld was born in Basel September 1923. After a commercial apprenticeship with a local architect he started to work in January 1945 for August Klipstein in Bern who headed the auction house Gutekunst und Klipstein dating back to 1864.

Art career 
The sudden death of August Klipstein in 1951 was a chance for the young Kornfeld to take over the lead of the house. The name changed from Klipstein und Kornfeld, to Kornfeld und Klipstein and finally to Galerie Kornfeld.

Distinctions 
 1982: Honorary doctorate of the University of Bern
 1984: Order of Merit of the Federal Republic of Germany
 1991: Knight of the French Ordre des Arts et des Lettres
 2004: Honorary citizen of Davos
 2011: Honorary citizen of Bern

Controversies 
Kornfeld has been involved in numerous controversies. In 1993 a lawsuit opposed him and  David P. Tunick, a Manhattan dealer concerning the authenticity of a signature.  In 2017, it was discovered that the son of Hitler's art dealer Hildebrand Gurlitt had been selling artworks from his secret stash in Munich through Kornfeld in Switzerland.  Kornfeld denied selling Nazi looted art. In 2019 a judge ordered that two Schiele's that Kornfeld had sold be restituted to the heirs of a Holocaust victim Fritz Grünbaum because they had been looted by Nazis.

Philanthropy 
Kornfeld has donated artworks to several museums, including the National Gallery of Art, the Norton Simon Museum, the Calder Foundation, the MoMa and the Kunstmuseum Basel.

Literature 
 Christine Ekelhart, Klaus Albrecht Schröder: Wege der Moderne: Aus der Sammlung Eberhard W. Kornfeld. Brandstätter, Vienna/Munich 2008, .
 Eberhard W. Kornfeld: Ernst Ludwig Kirchner: Nachzeichnung seines Lebens. Katalog der Sammlung Kirchner-Haus Davos. Kornfeld Verlag, Bern 1979, .
 Eberhard W. Kornfeld: Paul Klee: Verzeichnis des graphischen Werkes. Kornfeld Verlag, Bern 2005, .

Exhibitions 
 2009: Wege der Moderne: Aus der Sammlung Eberhard W. Kornfeld, Albertina, Vienna

See also 

 Cornelius Gurlitt
 Fritz Grünbaum

References 

1923 births
Swiss art dealers
Swiss auctioneers
Living people
Chevaliers of the Ordre des Arts et des Lettres
Commanders Crosses of the Order of Merit of the Federal Republic of Germany
Swiss curators
20th-century Swiss businesspeople
21st-century Swiss businesspeople